Kelkile Gezahegn Woldaregay (born 1 October 1996) is an Ethiopian long-distance runner who is specialized in marathon.

Career 
In 2016 Kelkile won three marathon competitions in China: in Chongqing (2:10:52), Hengshui (2:11:11)  and Hefei (2:08:54).

In 2017 he improved his personal best twice, first at the Rotterdam Marathon in April where he finished sixth in 2:07:29  and in October when he finished second at the Frankfurt Marathon in 2:06:55.

In 2018 he improved his personal best to 2:05:56 at the Rotterdam Marathon, finishing third. He won the Lanzhou Marathon in June in 2:11:00  and the Frankfurt Marathon in October in 2:06:37.

He began the 2019 season with a sixth place finish in the Dubai Marathon in January, clocking 2:06:09. He won the Ljubljana Marathon in October in 2:07:29.

In 2020 he won the Houston Marathon with a time of 2:08:36.

Personal Best 
 Marathon: 2:05:56, 8. April 2018, Rotterdam

References

External links 
 

Living people
1996 births
Ethiopian male marathon runners
Place of birth missing (living people)
21st-century Ethiopian people